The Belvedere on the Pfingstberg is a large structure north of the New Garden in Potsdam, Germany, at the summit of Pfingstberg hill. It was commissioned by King Friedrich Wilhelm IV of Prussia and built between 1847 and 1863 as a viewing platform.

Because of its architecture and historical importance, the Belvedere forms part of the UNESCO World Heritage Site Palaces and Parks of Potsdam and Berlin, inscribed in 1999.

History
It was commissioned by King Friedrich Wilhelm IV of Prussia and as completed is only part of a substantially more extensive project for the hilltop site. The Belvedere was built, as its name suggests, as a viewing platform for visitors and contains only two modest scale rooms for entertainment, one in each upper tower. The mural decoration of these (Roman-Etruscan and Moorish, respectively) is mostly now lost.

Architecturally eclectic, the two towers are modelled on Italian Renaissance architecture whilst the wings are Roman in style and some of the detailed decoration is Greek-inspired. It was constructed between 1847 and 1863 with an interruption from 1852 to 1860.

The landscape architect Peter Joseph Lenné was responsible for the design of the grounds which are planted in the manner of the English landscape garden, with serpentine paths and dense copses of hardwood trees. These now obstruct views of the Belvedere from the park and almost all points in Potsdam, but are apparently as designed by Lenné.

The Belvedere fell into disrepair during World War II and was left abandoned in the period of the German Democratic Republic. It was repaired between 1988 and 2005 by an association formed by a group of local residents. Today, the Belvedere is open to visitors and is still managed by the Förderverein Pfingstberg e.V. who won major financial backing for the restoration. Major contributors included the Hermann Reemtsma Stiftung and Werner Otto.

Description
The twin prospect towers from which the view over Potsdam is achieved rise above a very high podium. This is in the form of a three-sided courtyard with central reflecting pool. The three sides of the courtyard are themselves each capped with viewing terraces under colonnades – two Corinthian and one with astylar round arches.

Visitors ascend by many steps both outside and inside, with the final ascent being made via a narrow iron spiral staircase. Because of the dense tree planting of the park the view can only be achieved from the upper level.

Today
Occasional concerts are held on a stage in the reflecting pool of the courtyard and the two Belvedere rooms are available as a marriage venue.
Weddings can also be held by the reflecting pool in the courtyard, although the last outside wedding for 2020 was held on 16 October at 1:30pm.

Gallery

References

External links

 Official website run by a private association
 At the Monuments in Brandenburg database

Buildings and structures in Potsdam
Prussian cultural sites
World Heritage Sites in Germany